Billy Myers (13 April 1916 – 31 August 1963) was an Irish sportsperson. He played Gaelic football with his local club Dr. Crokes and was a member of the Kerry senior inter-county team from 1937 until 1943.

In a brief senior inter-county career, Myers won almost every honour in the game at senior level.  He won four All-Ireland medals, five Munster medals, and one Railway Cup medals with Munster.

References

1916 births
1963 deaths
Dr Crokes Gaelic footballers
Kerry inter-county Gaelic footballers
Munster inter-provincial Gaelic footballers